Qazaq Air is a Kazakh airline, which operates scheduled services from its main hub in Astana and focuses on domestic flights.

Qazaq Air is an interregional airline established by Samruk-Kazyna National Welfare Fund JSC on the initiative of the First President of the Republic of Kazakhstan Nursultan Nazarbayev to improve the safety and availability of interregional air traffic in Kazakhstan and the border areas of neighboring states in accordance with high international and national flight safety standards. The main mission is to connect the regions of the Republic of Kazakhstan and thereby contribute to their economic development.

Since Air Kazakhstan went bankrupt in 2004, in 2015, the government of Kazakhstan rebooted the airline as the successor of Air Kazakhstan, but with a name change to Qazaq Air following the ongoing change in the Kazakh alphabet from Cyrillic to Latin verses. The airline was rebooted as a regional airline.

Member of the International Air Transport Association IATA. Certified by IOSA international industrial safety standards since 2018.

History

2015 - 2018 
Qazaq Air was founded in April 2015 by the sovereign wealth fund Samruk-Kazyna. The airline was launched on 6 July 2015. It commenced operations on 27 August 2015 on the Almaty to Nur-Sultan route.

In May 2017, the first Kazakhstani pilots took up their duties at the airline. Since before that, the national personnel did not have the skills to control a new type of aircraft for Kazakhstan, in 2015 Qazaq Air selected 16 Kazakhstani pilots for training in flying De Havilland Dash-8-Q400NG aircraft. By the end of May 2017, 15 Kazakhstani pilots received permission to carry out independent flights as co-pilots of Qazaq Air, one pilot became the first Kazakhstani aircraft commander in the company [8].

At the end of 2017, Qazaq Air's performance indicators increased significantly compared to previous years: in 2017, more than 250 thousand passengers used the company's services (an increase of 53.6% over the same period in 2016), the number of routes increased to 15.In July 2017, the company operated an international flight for the first time - under a charter program, the carrier began operating flights from Almaty to Issyk-Kul airport in the village of Tamchy (Kyrgyzstan)

In June 2018, China Express Airlines (Huaxia Airlines) expressed its readiness to take part in the privatization of Qazaq Air. Regional air carriers have signed a memorandum of understanding on the development of strategic cooperation, which also involves the interaction of operators in the field of international passenger air transportation.
In November 2018, Qazaq Air became the third carrier in Kazakhstan to pass the operational safety audit of the International Air Transport Association (IATA) and receive the IOSA (IATA Operational Safety Audit) certificate from this organization.

2019 - to present 
Based on the results of the first half of 2019, the airline reported that it has transported more than 920 thousand passengers since the beginning of its operations.

In July 2019, Qazaq Air became the 293rd member of the International Air Transport Association (IATA)

In November 2019, the airline successfully passed the second operational safety audit of the International Air Transport Association (IATA) for compliance with IOSA standards, the validity of the certificate and the airline's IOSA operator status were extended until November 2021 [15].

Despite the pandemic and the ban on flights announced in March 2020, Qazaq Air completed the process of relocating the airbase to the capital of the country, Nur-Sultan, introduced a new booking and sales system, and also launched an electronic ticket. The target capacity of the new route network was achieved with the previously created interregional hub in Nur-Sultan. As a result, the Airline showed a record passenger traffic. More than 432 thousand passengers were transported and there was an increase of 14% compared to 2019.

Spring 2020, the Airline successfully launched a new and modern website flyqazaq.com with many convenient features. Passengers can pre-book a seat on board, increase their baggage or carry-on baggage allowance instantly without calls or personal calls to the Airline.

In May 2020, the Airline was able to quickly restore the route network, increase the number of flights and open new directions.

Fall 2020, the IQ Bonus loyalty program for frequent flyers was launched for the first time. IQ BONUS members have a choice of an instant discount on tickets (up to 3%) or the ability to accrue bonuses for flights on Qazaq Air flights

While buying tickets through www.flyqazaq.com, passengers can pre-book a seat on board, increase their baggage or carry-on baggage allowance, reserve the transportation of pets and sports equipment instantly without calls or personal calls to the Airline.

Spring 2021, Qazaq Air Airlines was successfully certified by the Aviation Administration of Kazakhstan for the maintenance and repair of aviation equipment for the operated type of aircraft of the De Havilland Dash-8 400 model. resources.

Since August 1, 2021, all Qazaq Air aircraft have passed under Kazakhstani registration. The airline has successfully passed the next stage of localization. The entire air fleet of Qazaq Air today has an updated aviation registration prefix - UP (state identification mark of aircraft of the Republic of Kazakhstan)

278 thousand passengers were transported in the 1st half of 2021, an increase of 88% comparing with the same period in 2020. Since 2015, passenger traffic has shown only positive dynamics.

Destinations

The route network of Qazaq Air includes the following directions:

1) Astana - Almaty, Balkhash, Taraz, Shymkent, Kyzylorda, Zhezkazgan, Aktobe, Kostanay, Petropavlovsk,

Pavlodar, Oskemen

2) Almaty - Shymkent, Kyzylorda, Oskemen

3) Atyrau - Aktau, Aktobe, Oral

4) Karaganda - Zhezkazgan

5) International flights to Omsk and Novosibirsk from Astana.

Fleet 

The QAZAQ AIR fleet is the youngest among the airlines in Kazakhstan and consists of modern comfortable Canadian-made De Havilland Dash-8-Q400NG turboprop airliners (formerly known as Bombardier Q400). This aircraft has a number of obvious advantages for short-range operations. Its main advantages are efficiency, speed, flight range and passenger capacity. De Havilland Dash-8-Q400NG is ideal for regional aviation and is used around the world.

As of 2021, the entire fleet of Qazaq Air Airlines is owned by Qazaq Air itself.

Due to the increasing passenger traffic and demand for air transportation both within Kazakhstan and in the border regions, the Airline plans to increase its fleet by 3 new aircraft.

Staff 

As of 2020, the total number of employees reached 280, including 74 administrative staff

and 206 production personnel. The airline has 52 pilots, 51 flight attendants, 14 engineers and 2 mechanics. The gender structure of the staff is 130 women and 150 men.

Today, our own certified organization for the maintenance and repair of aviation equipment is successfully operating. In 2021 Qazaq Air was certified by the Aviation Administration of Kazakhstan for the maintenance and repair of aviation equipment for the operated type of aircraft model De Havilland Dash-8 400

References

External links
Qazaq Air Official Website 
Qazaq Air Fleet Details and History

Airlines of Kazakhstan
Airlines established in 2015
2015 establishments in Kazakhstan